Llanos Township is one of the thirteen townships of Sherman County, Kansas, United States.  The population was 43 at the 2000 census.

Geography
Located in the northeastern corner of the county, it borders the following townships:
Bird City Township, Cheyenne County — north
Rocewood Township, Rawlins County — northeast
Barrett Township, Thomas County — east
West Hale Township, Thomas County — southeast
Union Township — south
Washington Township — southwestern corner
Shermanville Township — west
It lies northwest of the county seat of Goodland.  There are no communities in the township.

The intermittent Sappa and Beaver creeks flow through Llanos Township.

Transportation
Only local roads are located in Llanos Township.

Government
As an active township, Llanos Township is governed by a three-member board, composed of the township trustee, the township treasurer, and the township clerk.  The trustee acts as the township executive.

References

External links
County website

Townships in Sherman County, Kansas
Townships in Kansas